This is a list of the meet records from the annual California Community College Athletic Association Championships.

Men

Women

External links
History of Champions – Men
History of Champions –Women

Track and field competitions in the United States
College track and field competitions in the United States
Athletics (track and field) competition records